Admiral Dixon may refer to:

Manley Dixon (c. 1760–1837), British Royal Navy admiral
Manley Hall Dixon (1786–1864), British Royal Navy admiral
Robert E. Dixon (1906–1981), U.S. Navy admiral